Margaret Elizabeth Mullett (OBE) (1946-) is Professor Emerita of Byzantine Studies at Queen's University Belfast. She is a former director of Byzantine Studies at Dumbarton Oaks Research Library and Collection in Washington, D.C., the foremost centre for the study of Byzantium in North America. Mullett is a leading proponent of a more theoretical approach to Byzantine studies and Byzantine texts.

Education 
Mullett read Medieval History and Medieval Latin at Birmingham University. She received her PhD from the Centre for Byzantine Studies, Birmingham University, in 1981. Her dissertation was entitled, Theophylact Through His Letters: the Two Worlds of an Exile Bishop.

Career 
As Director at Dumbarton Oaks, Mullett was also the editor of Dumbarton Oaks Papers. Previous to her position at Dumbarton Oaks, she was a Professor of Byzantine Studies and Director of the Institute of Byzantine Studies at the Queen's University of Belfast and Director of the Queen's Gender Initiative. She is the author of Theophylact of Ochrid: Reading the Letters of a Byzantine Archbishop, Variorum, 1997. With Judith Herrin and Catherine Otten-Froux, she edited a Festchrift for A. H. S. Megaw, published in 2001 by the British School in Athens.

Mullett was created an Officer of the Order of the British Empire (OBE) in the Queen's Birthday Honours 2006.

A portrait of Mullet was unveiled at Queen's University Belfast and will hang in the university's Great Hall, alongside other luminaries of the university.

Bibliography 

 Knowing Bodies, Passionate Souls: Sense Perception in Byzantium (ed. by Susan Ashbrook Harvey and Margaret Mullett) (Washington, D.C): Dumbarton Oaks Research Library & Collection, 2017)
Mosaic: Festschrift for A.H.S Megaw, ed. by Judith Herrin, Margaret Mullett, and Catherine Otten-Froux (London: British School in Athens, 2001)
Theophylact of Ochrid: Reading the Letters of a Byzantine Archbishop (Variorum, 1997)

References

Officers of the Order of the British Empire
British Byzantinists
Living people
Alumni of the University of Birmingham
Year of birth missing (living people)
Scholars of Byzantine literature
Women Byzantinists
Women medievalists